SN UDS10Wil (SN Wilson) is a type Ia supernova, and as of April 2013, the farthest known.
It has a redshift of 1.914, which strongly implies that it exploded when the universe was about a third of its current size. It was discovered with the Hubble Space Telescope's Wide Field Camera 3. The nickname SN Wilson is after the American President Woodrow Wilson.

See also
List of most distant supernovae
List of the most distant astronomical objects

References

Supernovae
20130402
Cetus (constellation)